Anshu Malik (born 5 August 2001) is an Indian freestyle wrestler. She won the silver medal in the women's 57 kg event at the 2021 World Wrestling Championships held in Oslo, Norway. She is the first Indian wrestler to win a silver medal at the World Championships in the women's division.

Career
Anshu won gold in the 60 kg category of the Cadet Wrestling Championships.

In 2020, she won one of the bronze medals in the 57 kg event at the 2020 Asian Wrestling Championships held in New Delhi, India. In the same year, she won the silver medal in the women's 57 kg event at the 2020 Individual Wrestling World Cup held in Belgrade, Serbia.

In Asian Wrestling Championships 2021, Malik bagged Gold along with the likes of Vinesh Phogat and Divya Kakran.

In April 2022, she won one of the bronze medal in the 57 kg event at the 2022 Asian Wrestling Championships held in Ulaanbaatar.

In the 2022 Birmingham Commonwealth Games, she had to settle for the Silver Medal after reaching the women's 57 kg freestyle final.

Personal life
She comes from a family of wrestlers. She trains under coach Jagdeesh at the Chaudhary Bharat Singh Memorial Sports School in Nidani. Anshu's father Dharamvir Malik, was an international wrestler himself and worked with the CISF.

References

External links
 

Living people
2001 births
Indian female sport wrestlers
Sport wrestlers from Haryana
People from Jind district
Asian Wrestling Championships medalists
Wrestlers at the 2020 Summer Olympics
Olympic wrestlers of India
Wrestlers at the 2022 Commonwealth Games
Commonwealth Games silver medallists for India
Commonwealth Games medallists in wrestling
21st-century Indian women
Recipients of the Arjuna Award
Medallists at the 2022 Commonwealth Games